Ezra Cleveland (born May 8, 1998) is an American football guard for the Minnesota Vikings of the National Football League (NFL). He played college football at Boise State and was drafted by the Vikings in the second round of the 2020 NFL Draft.

Early years
Cleveland attended Bethel High School in Spanaway, Washington. He committed to Boise State University to play college football.

College career
Cleveland played at Boise State from 2016 to 2019. After redshirting his first year in 2016, he became a starter in 2017. During his career he started 40 games. After his junior season in 2019, Cleveland entered the 2020 NFL Draft.

Professional career

Cleveland was drafted by the Minnesota Vikings in the second round, 58th overall, in the 2020 NFL Draft.

Personal life
Cleveland was born 3 weeks early at 11 pounds.

References

External links
Minnesota Vikings bio
Boise State Broncos bio

1998 births
Living people
People from Spanaway, Washington
Players of American football from Washington (state)
American football offensive tackles
Boise State Broncos football players
Minnesota Vikings players